Same-sex marriage in South Dakota has been legal since June 26, 2015 when the U.S. Supreme Court ruled in Obergefell v. Hodges that the U.S. Constitution guarantees same-sex couples the right to marry. Attorney General Marty Jackley issued a statement critical of the ruling but said South Dakota is obligated to comply and the state would recognize same-sex marriages.

Legal history

Restrictions
South Dakota voters adopted a constitutional amendment in November 2006 that defined marriage as the union of a man and a woman and prohibited the recognition of same-sex relationships under any other name, such as civil unions and domestic partnerships. Similar restrictions appear in the state statutes as well.

In 2023, Representative Linda Duba introduced a bill to repeal the statutory ban and explicitly define marriage as the union between "two persons". A House committee voted 7–5 to kill the bill on February 13, 2023.

Lawsuit
On May 22, 2014, six same-sex couples filed a federal lawsuit against South Dakota officials seeking the right to marry and recognition of marriages performed in other jurisdictions. The suit, Rosenbrahn v. Daugaard, was brought by Minneapolis civil rights attorney Joshua A. Newville, who filed a similar lawsuit on behalf of seven same-sex couples in North Dakota on June 6, 2014. The suit named Governor Dennis Daugaard as the first-named defendant. U.S. District Court Judge Karen Schreier heard oral arguments on October 17. The state defendants argued she was bound by the Eighth Circuit's decision in Citizens for Equal Protection v. Bruning, which the plaintiffs said did not address the questions they were raising in this case. On November 12, Judge Schreier denied the defense's motion to dismiss. She found that Baker v. Nelson is no longer valid precedent and that Bruning did not address due process or the question of a fundamental right to marry. She dismissed the plaintiffs' claim that South Dakota violated their right to travel. On January 12, 2015, she ruled for the plaintiffs, finding that South Dakota was depriving them of their fundamental right to marry. She stayed implementation of her ruling pending appeal. On February 10, the plaintiffs asked her to lift the stay, citing the U.S. Supreme Court's denial of a stay in Alabama cases the previous day. Two days later, they requested an expedited response to that request. On March 2, 2015, Judge Schreier denied this motion. She concluded that once the defendants filed their notice of appeal, jurisdiction issue in the case, including the stay, would be transferred to the Eighth Circuit Court of Appeals. The Eighth Circuit announced on April 29, 2015, that it would defer consideration of the case, pending the U.S. Supreme Court's ruling in Obergefell v. Hodges in June 2015.

On June 26, 2015, the U.S. Supreme Court ruled that laws depriving same-sex couples of the rights and responsibilities of marriage violate the Due Process and Equal Protection clauses of the Fourteenth Amendment, legalizing same-sex marriage nationwide in the United States. Attorney General Marty Jackley announced the state would comply, "Because we are a nation of laws the state will be required to follow the court's order that every state must recognize and license same-sex marriage." In light of this development, the Eighth Circuit affirmed the judgement of the district court on August 12, 2015. However, it left the decision of whether or not to vacate the stay of permanent injunction of the laws discriminating against same-sex couples to the district court. On September 9, 2015, Judge Schreier granted the plaintiffs' motion to vacate the stay in light of the mandate from the Eighth Circuit.

Governor Daugaard announced the state would comply with the ruling, but said, "I would have preferred for this change to come through the democratic process, rather than the courts." Senator John Thune said he disagreed with the decision, "The court has issued its opinion, but on this particular issue, I do not agree with its conclusion." Representative Kristi Noem also disagreed with the ruling, and Senator Mike Rounds called it a "blow to state's rights". State Senator Brock Greenfield called it "judicial activism at its worst". Bishop Paul J. Swain of the Roman Catholic Diocese of Sioux Falls called the ruling "not a surprise but still a sad development". Methodist Bishop Bruce Ough declined to issue a formal stance, but stated that "[w]hile The United Methodist Church does not engage in partisan politics, we welcome all people and believe all have sacred worth.", and said the ruling would likely add "urgency to a longtime denominational debate" on the United Methodist Church's position on homosexuality. State Representative Karen Soli welcomed the court ruling, stating "In my own journey through the years, early in my life I wouldn't have felt that way but I've grown to understand that homosexuality is not something most people have a choice about. It's our job in society to accommodate them in ways that make it possible for these folks to be part of our society. It's time." The South Dakota chapter of the American Civil Liberties Union (ACLU) celebrated the decision, "Today's historic Supreme Court ruling means same-sex couples will soon have the freedom to marry and equal respect for their marriages across America. This ruling will bring joy to families, and final nationwide victory to the decades-long Freedom to Marry movement." The ACLU held a celebration party in Sioux Falls on June 26, handing out wedding cake to the newlyweds. Mark Church and Greg Kniffen, plaintiffs in Rosenbrahn, said they were "overjoyed", "We feel vindicated that we were on the right side of this argument all along."

Developments after legalization
In January 2020, Representative Tony Randolph introduced a bill to prohibit the state from "enforcing, endorsing or favoring" same-sex marriage. The bill stood in clear violation of the U.S. Constitution, which under Obergefell guarantees same-sex couples the right to marry. The ACLU responded in a statement: "Marriage equality is the law of the land in South Dakota and the entire nation, no matter what half-baked legal theories anti-LGBTQ lawmakers try to put forward." The bill was withdrawn at Randolph's request on February 24, 2020.

Native American nations
Same-sex marriage is legal on the reservation of the Oglala Sioux Tribe. A memorandum by the tribal attorney from January 25, 2016, confirmed that same-sex marriages are not prohibited under tribal law. The first same-sex marriage in the reservation was performed at the Tribal President's Office in Pine Ridge shortly thereafter. On July 8, 2019, the Oglala Sioux Tribal Council passed a same-sex marriage ordinance in a 12–3 vote with one abstention, amending the Tribal Code to recognize same-sex marriages. The Lakota people have traditionally recognized two-spirit people who were born male but wore women's clothing and performed everyday household work and artistic handiwork, such as beadwork and quillwork, which were regarded as belonging to the feminine sphere. These individuals are known as winkte in the Lakota language. Regarded as sacred, the  occupied a third gender role in Lakota society. They fulfilled ceremonial and spiritual roles, including preparing the traditional Sun Dance and as medicine people. Marriage with women was forbidden for most winkte, but some nevertheless married women and had children without giving up their winkte status. Often, winkte would marry already-married men who had wives and children. Chief Crazy Horse married one or two winkte in addition to his cisgender wives. Some winkte practiced polyandry, taking up to twelve husbands, while others remained unmarried, erecting their own tipis where they were visited by men for sexual intercourse.

Marriage statistics
In the first month of legalization, 40 same-sex couples were granted marriage licenses in the state. By June 26, 2016, 157 marriage licenses had been issued to same-sex couples in South Dakota. This made up around 2% of all marriage licenses issued in the state during that time, with a plurality in Minnehaha County at 40 licenses. By June 2017, 283 same-sex couples had married in South Dakota.

2018 estimates from the United States Census Bureau showed that there were about 1,500 same-sex households in South Dakota. The Bureau estimated that 77.8% of same-sex couples in the state were married.

Public opinion
A 2017 poll conducted by the Public Religion Research Institute found that 52% of South Dakotans supported same-sex marriage, while 37% were opposed and 11% were unsure or undecided. A PRRI survey conducted between March 8 and November 9, 2021, showed that 61% of South Dakota respondents supported same-sex marriage, while 39% were opposed. This level of support was similar to neighboring states, including Nebraska and Wyoming at 58%, Montana at 62% and North Dakota at 69%.

See also
LGBT rights in South Dakota
Same-sex marriage in the United States

References

LGBT in South Dakota
South Dakota
2015 in LGBT history
2015 in South Dakota